Suhaim bin Hamad bin Abdullah bin Jassim bin Muhammed Al Thani (1933 – 21 August 1985) was a member of the ruling family of Qatar who served as the country's foreign minister. His brother, Khalifa bin Hamad Al Thani, was the emir of Qatar.

Career
Sheikh Suhaim was appointed minister of foreign affairs in 1972. He served in the post until his death on 21 August 1985.
He had a great deal of participation, particularly in political, humanitarian, social and cultural activities.

In 1985, he plotted a coup against his brother Khalifa bin Hamad Al Thani after he learned that Khalifa had named his own son, Hamad bin Khalifa Al Thani, as the heir. He had his own cache of weapons and maintained a cadre of supporters in northern Qatar. After Suhaim died suddenly of a heart attack in August 1985, his sons blamed Ghanim Al Kuwari, the minister of information and culture, for not responding promptly to his calls for medical attention. They were imprisoned after they attempted to assassinate Al Kuwari.

Legacy
In 2008 a fellowship fund was established at Harvard University’s John F. Kennedy School of Government for the memory of Suhaim bin Hamad Al Thani.

Children
He had nine sons and five daughters from the same wife, Muna bint Jassim Al Hassan Al Dosari.

Daughters
 Muna bint Suhaim
 Rudha bint Suhaim
 Amna bint Suhaim
 Al Anoud bint Suhaim
Muneera bint Suhaim

References

External links
althani tree

1933 births
1985 deaths
Foreign ministers of Qatar
Suhaim bin Hamad